The Overseas Final was a Motorcycle speedway Final sanctioned by the FIM as a qualifying round for the Speedway World Championship between 1981 and 2001.

Introduced to the World Championship in 1981, it served as a qualifying round for Commonwealth and American riders. The Overseas Final was originally intended to replace the Commonwealth Final, but stayed on the World Championship calendar when the Commonwealth was re-introduced in 1986.

Editions
All 21 Overseas Finals were held in England.

See also
 Speedway World Championship
 Speedway Grand Prix
 Motorcycle speedway

References